The Building at 1619 Third Avenue in Columbus, Georgia is a Victorian shotgun cottage built around 1889 which was listed on the National Register of Historic Places in 1980.

It was home to lower to middle income black workers in Columbus.  By 1896 it was home to George W. Walls, a dyer for Eagle and Phenix Mills.  By 1898 it was home for Mack Culver and his wife;  Culver was a fireman for the Central of Georgia Railroad.  By 1900 it was home of William Hines, another worker at Eagle and Phenix, and his wife Clara.

Its front porch includes some gingerbreading attached to its chamfered columns as a nod by the builder to popular styles.

Its National Register listing was within a batch of numerous Columbus properties determined to be eligible consistent with a 1980 study of historic resources in Columbus.

See also
Building at 1617 Third Avenue, adjacent and similar

References

Shotgun architecture
National Register of Historic Places in Muscogee County, Georgia
Victorian architecture in Georgia (U.S. state)
Buildings and structures completed in 1889